Brian O'Donoghue (born 10 September 1983, in Galway) was an inter-county Gaelic football goalkeeper from Galway who plays for Claregalway and Galway,

O'Donoghue made his senior debut for Galway in June 2003, against Leitrim. He has battled with Alan Keane  for the number one position in Galway's team.

Soccer
O'Donoghue also plays for Mervue United in the League of Ireland First Division.

References

1983 births
Living people
Claregalway Gaelic footballers
Gaelic football goalkeepers
Galway inter-county Gaelic footballers
Republic of Ireland association footballers
Gaelic footballers who switched code
League of Ireland players
Association footballers from County Galway
Mervue United A.F.C. players
Association footballers not categorized by position